Bahar Banu Begum (9 October 1590 - 8 September 1653), meaning "The Blooming Lady", was a Mughal princess, the daughter of Mughal emperor Jahangir.

Birth
Bahar Banu Begum was born on  9 October 1590, during the reign of her grandfather Emperor Akbar. Her mother was Karamsi, the daughter of Raja Keshav Das of the Rathore family. On the same day, Jagat Gosain, the daughter of Udai Singh of Marwar, gave birth to another daughter named Begum Sultan Begum. She was the seventh child and fifth daughter born to her father, but the only girl child of her mother.

Marriage
In 1625, Prince Tahmuras Mirza, the eldest son of Prince Daniyal Mirza, and the grandson of Akbar, paid homage at the court. Prior to this his younger brother Prince Hushang Mirza also attained the honour of paying homage. In order to honour them, Jahangir married Bahar Banu to Tahmuras, and Hoshmand Banu Begum, the daughter of Prince Khusrau Mirza, to Hoshang.

After the death of her father Jahangir on 28 October 1627, her youngest brother Prince Shahryar Mirza proclaimed himself the emperor. However, her nephew Dawar Bakhsh, the son of Khusrau Mirza, ascended the throne at Lahore. Shah Jahan ascended the throne on 19 January 1628, and on 23 January, he ordered the execution of Shahryar, Bahar Banu Begum's husband Tahmuras Mirza and his brother Hoshang Mirza, and Khusrau Mirza's sons Dawar Bakhsh, and Garshasp Mirza.

Death
Bahar Banu Begum died at Agra on 8 September 1653 at the age of sixty-two, and was buried in the tomb of Mariam-uz-zamani, her grandmother by Shah Jahan.

References

Mughal princesses
1590 births
1653 deaths
Mughal nobility
Indian female royalty
16th-century Indian women
16th-century Indian people
17th-century Indian women
17th-century Indian people
Indian princesses 
Women of the Mughal Empire
Mughal royalty 
Indian royalty
Daughters of emperors